Sorcerer's Apprentice may refer to:
 "The Sorcerer's Apprentice", a 1797 poem by Johann Wolfgang von Goethe

Books
 The Sorcerer's Apprentice (Ewers novel), 1910 novel by Hanns Heinz Ewers
 Sorcerer's Apprentice (Augiéras novel), a 1964 novel by François Augiéras
 The Sorcerer's Apprentice (Bulis novel), a 1995 novel written by Christopher Bulis based on the British science fiction television series Doctor Who
 Sorcerer's Apprentice (Shah book), a 1998 travel book by Tahir Shah

Film and television
 "The Sorcerer's Apprentice", a segment of the 1940 Disney animated film Fantasia, which uses the music by Dukas and the story from Goethe's poem
 The Sorcerer's Apprentice (1955 film), a short film
 The Sorcerer's Apprentice (1980), a Canadian animated short film 
 The Sorcerer's Apprentice (2001 film), a British film made in South Africa 
 The Sorcerer's Apprentice (2010 film), a 2010 Jon Turteltaub film and video game based on it
 The Sorcerer's Apprentice (TV series), a children's television series
 "The Sorcerer's Apprentice" (Alfred Hitchcock Presents), a 1962 episode that never received a network airing
 Krabat – The Sorcerer's Apprentice, a 1977 animated film by Karel Zeman

Other uses
 The Sorcerer's Apprentice (Dukas), the 1897 symphonic poem by Paul Dukas based on Goethe's poem
 Sorcerer's Apprentice (Atari 2600), based on a segment of the 1940 film Fantasia
 The Sorcerer's Apprentice, a 2010 video game based on 2010 The Sorcerer's Apprentice film

See also
 The Magician's Apprentice (disambiguation)
 Sorcerer's Apprentice Syndrome, a computer network protocol flaw